Nicki Greenberg is a Melbourne-based Australian comic artist and illustrator.

Nicki is a frequent presenter at schools, festivals and conferences, where her speaking style is described as passionate, engaging and full of energy.

Nicki now dedicates most of her ink to books for younger readers. Her favorite activity is making books, but when she does manage to tear herself away from the desk Nicki loves to crochet bizarre sea creatures.

Early life 
Greenberg had early success when in 1990, at the age of fifteen, she published The Digits, a series of twelve books featuring her fingerprints as characters. The books sold over 380,000 copies in Australia and New Zealand.

Career 
Her graphic novel adaptation of F. Scott Fitzgerald's The Great Gatsby (The Great Gatsby: a graphic adaptation) was published in 2007 by Allen & Unwin in Australia and by Penguin in Canada.  Her graphic adaptation of Hamlet was published by Allen & Unwin in 2010.

She has written and illustrated a number of other children's books, including Squids Suck (2005), Antonia Cutlass Walks the Plank (2006), and Operation Weasel Ball (2007).  Greenberg is a regular contributor to the regular Australian comics anthology Tango, edited by Bernard Caleo and published by Cardigan Comics.

In 2009, Greenberg's work appeared in Super Heroes and Schlemiels: Jews and Comic Art, an exhibition of comic art at the Jewish Museum of Australia in Melbourne. She has been interviewed by The New Yorker in its on-line cartoon forum, by Jennifer Byrne on ABC1 television, and as part of The Book Show on ABC radio.

See also 

222

References

External links 
 Nicki Greenberg website

Artists from Melbourne
Australian comics artists
Australian cartoonists
Australian women cartoonists
Australian Jews
Living people
Jewish women artists
Australian female comics artists
1974 births